Eurymylidae is a family of extinct simplicidentates.  Most authorities consider them to be basal to all modern rodents and may have been the ancestral stock whence the most recent common ancestor of all modern rodents (crown rodents) arose.  However, the more completely known eurymylids, including Eurymylus, Heomys, Matutinia, and Rhombomylus, appear to represent a monophyletic side branch not directly ancestral to rodents (Meng et al., 2003). Huang et al. (2004) have argued that Hanomys, Matutinia, and Rhombomylus form a clade characterized by distinctive features of the skull and dentition that should be recognized as a separate family, Rhombomylidae. Eurymylids are only known from Asia.

Classification
Modified from McKenna and Bell (1997) following generic taxonomy of Ting et al. (2002) and Huang et al. (2004)

Mirorder Simplicidentata – simplicidentates
Family †Eurymylidae
†Heomys

†Zagmys
†Nikolomylus

Subfamily †Eurymylinae

†Kazygurtia
†Eomylus
†Eurymylus
†Amar
†Hanomys
†Rhombomylus
†Matutinia
†Decipomys
Subfamily †Khaychininae
†Khaychina
Order Rodentia – crown rodents (including all extant rodents)

References

Huang, X., C. Li, M.R. Dawson, and L. Liu, 2003. Hanomys malcolmi, a new simplicidentate mammal from the Paleocene of central China: its relationships and stratigraphic implications Bulletin of Carnegie Museum of Natural History 36(1):81–89.
McKenna, Malcolm C., and Bell, Susan K. 1997. Classification of Mammals Above the Species Level. Columbia University Press, New York, 631 pp. 
Meng, J., Y. Hu, C. Li, 2003. The osteology of Rhombomylus (Mammalia, Glires): implications for phylogeny and evolution of Glires Bulletin of the American Museum of Natural History 275:1–247. 
Ting, S., J. Meng, M.C. McKenna, and C. Li. 2002. The osteology of Matutinia (Simplicidentata, Mammalia) and its relationship to Rhombomylus. American Museum Novitates, 3371:1–33. 

Prehistoric rodent families
Paleocene mammals
Eocene mammals
Paleocene first appearances
Eocene extinctions